St. Rupert Mayer's High School is a private Catholic secondary school, located in Makonde District, Chinhoyi, in Mashonaland West, Zimbabwe. The school was founded by the Society of Jesus in 2000 and aims to offer quality education inspired by the Catholic ethos. It is part of the bigger St Rupert Mayer Mission which, in addition to the high school, comprises a primary school, a hospital, and a parish.

School history 
The school was founded in 2000, following a request by the local community for a mission boarding school. Seeing the need to start a high school, Fr. Chazunguza in collaboration with Wolfgang Tamm (the then Education secretary of the Chinhoyi Diocese) established the school. The foundation of the mission high school was approved by the Ministry of Education on the basis that it was to be a proper boarding school. Fr. Mabiri replaced Fr. Chazunguza and served from 2000 till May 2002. Karl Hermann took over in 2004.

See also

 Catholic Church in Zimbabwe
 Education in Zimbabwe
 List of Jesuit schools

References 

Buildings and structures in Mashonaland West Province
Private schools in Zimbabwe
Jesuit secondary schools in Zimbabwe
Educational institutions established in 2000
2000 establishments in Zimbabwe